How to Deter a Robber is a 2020 American crime comedy film written and directed by Maria Bissell and starring Vanessa Marano, Benjamin Papac, Abbie Cobb, Sonny Valicenti, Gabrielle Carteris and Chris Mulkey.  It is Bissell's feature directorial debut.

Cast
Vanessa Marano as Madison Williams
Benjamin Papac as Jimmy
Chris Mulkey as Andy Reynolds
Gabrielle Carteris as Charlotte
Leah Lewis as Heather
Arnold Y. Kim as Scott
Abbie Cobb as Christine Schroeder
Sonny Valicenti as Patrick Lindner

Premise
A teenage girl, her boyfriend and her uncle, face off against a pair of burglars.

Plot
While spending Christmas at a lakeside holiday cabin, Madison (Vanessa Marano) bickers with her mother (Gabrielle Carteris).  Bored and annoyed, she and her dopey boyfriend Jimmy (Benjamin Papac) spot a light switched on in their neighbours' presumably empty house.  They enter it and finding a Ouija board inside, they use it before falling asleep in a drunken and stoned state in one of the bedrooms.

Next morning on waking up, they discover that the place has been ransacked.  They telephone the local police who on arrival, do not initially believe the teenager's story but have doubts about their culpability on realising that they were the ones who had dialled 911 in the first place.  Thus Madison and Jimmy - as minors - are compelled by the law to stay in the immediate local area pending the conclusion of the police investigation which requires that they are placed in the custody of Madison's uncle Andy (Chris Mulkey).

When Andy's house is also broken into and burglarized, the trio retreat to the family's primary enclave, and fearful of the burglars, Madison and Jimmy set up "Home Alone"-style booby-traps.

The burglars - Patrick (Sonny Valicenti) and Christine (Abbie Cobb) - eventually show up.  A hostage situation then materializes causing Madison to fight in partnership with Jimmy.

Production
The film was shot in 17 days.

Release
The film premiered at the Fantastic Fest on September 29, 2020.

Reception
The film has  rating on Rotten Tomatoes.  Marisa Maribal of Slash Film gave the film a 7.5 out 10.

Mel Valentin of Screen Anarchy gave the film a positive review and wrote, "How to Deter a Robber will and should be remembered as the work of a talented, first-time filmmaker."

References

External links
 
 

American crime comedy films
2020s English-language films
2020s American films